The 2019–20 WNBL season is the 40th season of the competition since its establishment in 1981. The Canberra Capitals were the defending champions and they successfully defended their title with a 2–0 win over Southside. The 2019–20 title was the ninth overall for the Capitals franchise.

Chemist Warehouse will again be the WNBL's naming rights partner for this season, after signing a three-year deal in July 2018. Spalding again provided equipment including the official game ball, alongside iAthletic supplying team apparel for the third year.

Player movement

Standings

Finals

Statistics

Individual statistic leaders

Individual game highs

Awards

Player of the Week

Team of the Week

Postseason Awards

Team captains and coaches

References

External links 
 WNBL official website

 
2019–20 in Australian basketball
Australia
Basketball
Basketball